Dr. Tsui Shung-yiu, SBS, JP is a former Director of the Hong Kong Marine Department.

He was awarded the Silver Bauhinia Star in 2006. Tsui retired as director after 28 years with the Government. He was a member of the marine and naval architecture discipline advisory panel of the HKIE (Hong Kong Institute of Engineers). He was part of a high-level delegation to promote Hong Kong's maritime services at the Posidonia 2002 International Shipping Exhibition in Greece in June 2002.

He is currently a consultant to Shun Tak-China Travel Ship Management.

External links
Hong Kong government information site
Hong Kong Marine Department info site

Hong Kong civil servants
Hong Kong engineers
Living people
Year of birth missing (living people)
Place of birth missing (living people)
Recipients of the Silver Bauhinia Star